The Hebrew Union College Annual (HUCA) is an annual peer-reviewed academic journal in the field of Jewish studies. It was established in 1924 and is published by the  Hebrew Union College. The editors-in-chief are David H. Aaron and Jason Kalman.

External links 
 

Judaic studies journals
Publications established in 1924
Annual journals
Academic journals published by universities and colleges
Multilingual journals
Hebrew Union College – Jewish Institute of Religion